Highway 926 is a provincial highway in the north-east region of the Canadian province of Saskatchewan. It runs from Highway 120 near Candle Lake to Highway 969. Highway 926 is about 79 km (49 mi) long.

Highway 926 also connects with Highway 265, Highway 970, and Highway 931.

See also 
Roads in Saskatchewan
Transportation in Saskatchewan

References 

926